is a former Japanese football player.

Suzaki previously played for Júbilo Iwata in the J1 League.

Club statistics

National team statistics

Appearances in major competitions

References

External links

1989 births
Living people
Association football people from Mie Prefecture
Japanese footballers
J1 League players
J2 League players
Júbilo Iwata players
FC Gifu players
Association football defenders